Richfield Tower, also known as the Richfield Oil Company Building, was an office tower constructed between 1928 and 1929 and served as the headquarters of Richfield Oil in Los Angeles, California.

History
It was designed by Stiles O. Clements and featured a black and gold Art Deco façade. The unusual color scheme was meant to symbolize the "black gold" that was Richfield's business.  Haig Patigian did the exterior sculptures. The building was covered with architectural terra cotta manufactured by Gladding, McBean, as was typical of many west coast buildings from this era. In an unusual move, all four sides were covered since they were all visible in the downtown location.

Lighting on the tower was made to simulate an oilwell gusher and the motif was reused at some Richfield service stations.

The company outgrew the building, and it was demolished in 1969, much to the dismay of Los Angeles residents and those interested in architectural preservation, to make way for the present ARCO Plaza skyscraper complex. The elaborate black-and-gold elevator doors were salvaged from the building and now reside in the lobby of the new ARCO building (now City National Tower).

The central figures of the Tympanum (Navigation, Aviation, Postal Service and Industry) over the main entry were donated by the Atlantic Richfield Company to the UC Santa Barbara Art & Design Museum, negotiated by Professor David Gebhard, noted UCSB architectural historian. He published a small illustrated volume on the building before demolition: The Richfield Building 1928–1968 
(Atlantic Richfield Co., Santa Barbara, 1970).
After languishing in university storage for over a decade, three of the four figures were mounted outside the UCSB Student Health Center in 1982. The fourth figure was incomplete and remains in storage.

Richfield Tower was starkly featured in a few scenes of Michelangelo Antonioni's 1970 film Zabriskie Point, shot shortly before its demolition.

Gallery

See also

Explanatory notes

References

Further reading

External links 
 

Skyscraper office buildings in Los Angeles
Buildings and structures in Downtown Los Angeles
Former skyscrapers
ARCO
Oil company headquarters in the United States
Office buildings completed in 1929
Buildings and structures demolished in 1969
Demolished buildings and structures in Los Angeles
Demolished buildings and structures in California
1929 establishments in California
1920s architecture in the United States
Morgan, Walls & Clements buildings
Art Deco architecture in California